Silperisone (INN) is a muscle relaxant.

See also 
 Chemically and mechanistically related drugs: eperisone, inaperisone, lanperisone, tolperisone

References 

Muscle relaxants
1-Piperidinyl compounds
Silanes
Fluoroarenes
Organosilicon compounds